The 2008–09 Algerian Cup was the 45th edition of the Algerian Cup. CR Belouizdad won the Cup by defeating CA Bordj Bou Arreridj 2-1 on penalties in the final, after the game ended 0-0. It was the sixth time that CR Belouizdad won the trophy.

Round of 32

Quarter-finals

Semi-finals

Final
Kickoff times are in local time.

Champions

External links
 Coupe d'Algérie 2009
 Algeria 2008/09 Coupe Nationale

Algerian Cup
Algerian Cup
Algerian Cup
Algerian Cup